, also referred to as  or  (after the main character), is a Japanese tokusatsu television series created by Shotaro Ishinomori and the sixth program in the Kamen Rider Series. The series was a co-production between Toei and Ishinomori Productions. The series aired every Friday at 7:00 PM on MBS from October 5, 1979 to October 10, 1980. 

The 1979 series was intended as a revival of the original 1971 series of the same name, going back to the basic, essential themes established in that show.

Story
Doctor Keitarō Shido, an acclaimed scientist, has been kidnapped by the terrorist organization Neo-Shocker to exploit his expertise in robotics technology. Desperate to escape, he convinces Neo-Shocker's command to allow him to operate on an injured camper. Explaining that he can turn the camper, Hiroshi Tsukuba into a powerful Neo-Shocker warrior, they allow Doctor Shido to operate. However, he quickly turns the tables on them, transforming Hiroshi, not into a kaijin, but the powerful warrior Sky Rider, using his newfound abilities to combat the evil Neo-Shocker menace.

Characters
: A gliding enthusiast caught in a conflict with Neo-Shocker after one of their agents murdered his friends.
: A scientist targeted by Neo-Shocker who was responsible for Hiroshi becoming Sky Rider. To keep a low profile, having hang glided in his youth, Shido founded the Shido Hang Glide Club and last aided Sky Rider in disarming a Plus-Alpha Bomb before leaving the country to join the Anti-Neo-Shocker Committee.
: Shido's aide.
:  A member of the Shido Hang Glide Club.
: A member of the Shido Hang Glide Club.
: A photojournalist who is looking for a good story, usually losing consciousness when he is about to stumble into a fight between Sky Rider and Neo-Shocker.
: A senior of Hiroshi's and a friend of Shido, Tani owns the Blanca Coffee Shop that serves as Sky Rider's new base of operations. Having lost his family to Neo-Shocker in the past, Tani is eager to help Hiroshi take the organization down.

Neo-Shocker
Shocker is once again reformed as the  organization, playing a role in numerous disappearances and terrorist attacks against the Japanese government. Spreading their influence across the world, their goal is the genocide of about two thirds of the current human population on Earth with them as the dominant majority. Though the other branches are succeeding unopposed, only the Japanese branch is making no progress due to the interference of Sky Rider.
 : A giant dragon who is the leader of the Neo-Shocker organization. Destroyed in a bomb explosion by the combined efforts of all previous Kamen Riders.
 : The first chief of Neo-Shocker's Japanese branch, armed with a cane. Eventually promoted, Monster underwent a modification into Yamorijin, a gecko cyborg. Due to a recent failure he was presented with the red eye, which signals that if he fails for a final time he will be terminated. He was executed by Admiral Majin after he was defeated by Sky Rider's Sky Kick. He is revived by the Badan Empire in Kamen Rider Spirits vol. 8, kidnapping people in Sapporo. He was eventually destroyed by Kamen Rider ZX's Rider Spin Shot and crashed into Admiral Majin.
 : The second and final chief of the Neo-Shocker organization. He was the only Neo-Shocker member with no kaijin form. He was executed by the Great Leader after being defeated by Kamen Rider #2, Kamen Rider Stronger and Sky Rider's triple kick. He is revived by the Badan Empire in Kamen Rider Spirits vol. 8, confronting Sky Rider in Mashu Lake, but is eventually destroyed by Sky Rider's Dragonfly Chute and crashed into Yamorijin.
 : Gingaoh is the main antagonist in the Sky Rider movie, a mechanical alien invader that Neo-Shocker formed an alliance with. He was destroyed in his spaceship explosion.
 : Ant-like foot soldiers in black.
 : Skull-masked elite guards who wield swords and crossbows.
 Neo-Shocker Scientists:
 : A friend of General Monster. After General Monster died, he was sentenced to death by Admiral Majin and killed by Shibirayjin.
 : An authority on brain surgery. Killed by Kamen Rider Stronger's Electro Shock.
 : He repairs or scraps Ari Commands in a dock disguised as a pediatric clinic.
 : Termite-like scientists who assist in the conversion of humans into cyborgs.

Episodes 
  (Original Airdate: October 5, 1979)
  (Original Airdate: October 12, 1979)
  (Original Airdate: October 19, 1979)
  (Original Airdate: October 26, 1979)
  (Original Airdate: November 2, 1979)
  (Original Airdate: November 9, 1979)
  (Original Airdate: November 16, 1979)
  (Original Airdate: November 23, 1979)
  (Original Airdate: November 30, 1979)
  (Original Airdate: December 7, 1979)
  (Original Airdate: December 14, 1979)
  (Original Airdate: December 21, 1979)
  (Original Airdate: December 28, 1979)
  (Original Airdate: January 4, 1980)
  (Original Airdate: January 11, 1980)
  (Original Airdate: January 18, 1980)
  (Original Airdate: January 25, 1980)
  (Original Airdate: February 1, 1980)
  (Original Airdate: February 8, 1980)
  (Original Airdate: February 15, 1980)
  (Original Airdate: February 22, 1980)
  (Original Airdate: February 29, 1980)
  (Original Airdate: March 7, 1980)
  (Original Airdate: March 14, 1980)
  (Original Airdate: March 21, 1980)
  (Original Airdate: March 28, 1980)
  (Original Airdate: April 4, 1980)
  (Original Airdate: April 11, 1980)
  (Original Airdate: April 18, 1980)
  (Original Airdate: April 25, 1980)
  (Original Airdate: May 2, 1980)
  (Original Airdate: May 9, 1980)
  (Original Airdate: May 16, 1980)
  (Original Airdate: May 23, 1980)
  (Original Airdate: May 30, 1980)
  (Original Airdate: June 6, 1980)
  (Original Airdate: June 13, 1980)
  (Original Airdate: June 20, 1980)
  (Original Airdate: June 27, 1980)
  (Original Airdate: July 4, 1980)
  (Original Airdate: July 11, 1980)
  (Original Airdate: July 18, 1980)
  (Original Airdate: July 25, 1980)
  (Original Airdate: August 1, 1980)
  (Original Airdate: August 8, 1980)
  (Original Airdate: August 15, 1980)
  (Original Airdate: August 22, 1980)
  (Original Airdate: August 29, 1980)
  (Original Airdate: September 5, 1980)
  (Original Airdate: September 12, 1980)
  (Original Airdate: September 19, 1980)
  (Original Airdate: September 26, 1980)
  (Original Airdate: October 3, 1980)
  (Original Airdate: October 10, 1980)

Special
Immortal Kamen Rider Special aired on September 8, 1979. Tobei Tachibana visits a Kamen Rider museum where he talks to some children about the Kamen Riders. Scenes from Kamen Rider, X, Amazon and Stronger are shown. He's about to introduce a new Kamen Rider when some of the kids remind him that he forgot Kamen Rider V3. Clips from the movie Kamen Rider V3 vs. Destron Mutants are shown. After the movie clips, Tobei Tachibana introduces Sky Rider, with previews of New Kamen Rider.

Movie
The Movie Eight Riders vs. Gingaoh (仮面ライダー 8人ライダーVS銀河王 Kamen Raidā: Hachi'nin Raidā Tai Gingaō) was released on March 15, 1980 and features Sky Rider teaming up with the previous 7 riders.

Cast
Hiroaki Murakami as Hiroshi Tsukuba
Kimiko Tanaka as Midori Kanō
Naoko Fushimi as Michi Sugimura
Kaori Tatsumi as Yumi Nozaki
Ryūmei Azuma as Imata Tonda
Mie Suzuki as Naoko Itō
Sayako Eguchi as Aki Ozawa
Jin Takase as Numa
Kōji Shiratori as Shigeru Kanō
Tomaru Katsura as Kanji Yada
Gorō Naya as The Great Leader
Shinzō Hotta as General Monster
Yōsuke Naka as Admiral Majin
Takashi Tabata as Keitarō Shido
Nobuo Tsukamoto as Genjirō Tani
Shinji Nakae as Narrator

Songs
Opening themes

Lyrics: Shotaro Ishinomori
Composition & Arrangement: Shunsuke Kikuchi
Artist: Ichirou Mizuki and Kōrogi '73
Episodes: 1-28

Lyrics: Shotaro Ishinomori
Composition & Arrangement: Shunsuke Kikuchi
Artist: Ichirou Mizuki
Episodes: 29-54

Ending themes

Lyrics: Saburō Yatsude
Composition & Arrangement: Shunsuke Kikuchi
Artist: Ichirou Mizuki and Kōrogi '73
Episodes: 1-28

Lyrics: Saburō Yatsude
Composition & Arrangement: Shunsuke Kikuchi
Artist: Ichirou Mizuki and The Chirps
Episodes: 29-54

References

1970s Japanese television series
1980s Japanese television series
1979 Japanese television series debuts
1980 Japanese television series endings
Skyrider
Mainichi Broadcasting System original programming